Govt. Boys' High School, Gunupur, is located beside the banks of Vamsadhara River at Gunupur of Rayagada district in the Indian state of Odisha. The original structure of the  public educational building is totally made of stone & the institution stands on an  elevated plot of the town. It is one of the oldest High Schools of the district. It is an oriya medium school affiliated to the Board of Secondary Education, Odisha under State Government of Odisha. The school celebrates its Centenary celebration in April 2015.

History
The  111-year-old high school was established in the year 1903. During pre-independence period, the district Board at koraput (with the collector and Agent as its president) upgraded the middle school at Gunupur to a High School in 1929. The school was a pioneer in the development of education in the undivided koraput district. It has given rise to many well known personalities such as former justice of High Court of Odisha M. Papanna (worked as judge from 29.09.2000 to 03.03.2004), Nagbhushan Patnaik, Sri Arjuna Gamang, Pandit Raghunath Panigrahi. The school maintains an ECO Club

See also
Board of Secondary Education, Odisha
List of schools in India

References

Boys' schools in India
High schools and secondary schools in Odisha
Education in Rayagada district
Educational institutions established in 1903
1903 establishments in India